Bedrock Gardens is a  garden located on a  property in Lee, New Hampshire, notable for its landscape design, its horticulture and its sculpture.

History
Named for its ever-present ledge, Bedrock Gardens was bought by its present owners in 1980. Over the next 30 years,  were developed into a large ornamental garden. The wooded areas were lumbered, which created a trail system. A wildlife pond was built, and work was started on its multiple perennial and shrub beds. Hardscape in the form of walls, paths, water features, structures, and topographical improvements, have been added. Today it is noted for its concept of "the garden as a journey," with a starting point, "events" (or garden spaces) as places to go, and something to do along the way. It has been called "one of the most beautiful and intriguing private landscapes in New Hampshire".
In 2019, a 98 space parking lot, a welcome kiosk and restrooms were added. In 2020, there were 12,000 visitors.

Interest points
Bedrock Garden's main attractions fall into three categories: landscape design, horticulture, and art.

Landscape design
There are many structures including a tea house, pergolas, a torii, and water features. The smaller gardens include a more formal parterre, the spiritual "Spiral" garden, and the primitive "Dark Woods".

Horticulture
The Gardens contain over one thousand different plant species, many of which are in perennial beds, arranged with attention to texture, color, and size. There are other collections, such as the dwarf conifer collection, a  grass garden, and a rock garden.

Art
Nancy Grimes, the previous owner of New England Garden Ornaments in North Brookfield, called Nooney "the most imaginative and energetic force in modern American garden ornamentation." Many of her sculptures are from old agricultural tools.

Friends of Bedrock Gardens
In 2013, the Friends of Bedrock Gardens was formed and acquired nonprofit status. While Bedrock Gardens is currently privately owned, the ownership and management will be transferred to the Friends.

Gallery

See also 
 List of botanical gardens in the United States

References

Additional resources

 Accessed March 16, 2009.
 Accessed March 16, 2009.
 Accessed March 16, 2009.
 Accessed March 16, 2009.

 Accessed March 16, 2009.

Sculpture-related

External links
Bedrock Gardens website

Gardens in New Hampshire